"Tal Vez" is a song by Argentine rapper Paulo Londra. Released by Warner Latina and Big Ligas on April 4, 2019, it was written by Londra, Cristian Salazar and Ovy on the Drums, who also produced the song.

Charts

Weekly charts

Year-end charts

Certifications

See also
 List of Billboard Argentina Hot 100 top-ten singles in 2019

References

2019 singles
Paulo Londra songs
2019 songs
Spanish-language songs